Rollin Carolas Mallary (May 27, 1784 – April 15, 1831) was an American lawyer and politician. He served as U.S. Representative from Vermont.

Biography
Mallary was born in Cheshire, Connecticut, and graduated from Middlebury College in 1805. He moved to Poultney, Vermont where he studied law and was admitted to the bar. He began the practice of law in Castleton, Vermont in 1807. Mallary married Ruth Stanley Mallary, and they had four children.

Mallary was elected trustee of the Rutland County Grammar School in 1807. He was appointed by Governor Israel Smith as Secretary to the Governor and Council in 1807, he held that position again from 1809 to 1812 and from 1815 to 1819. He served as the State's attorney for Rutland County from 1811 to 1813. In 1816, Mallary moved to Poultney, Vermont. He was defeated for Congress in 1819 because votes for several of the towns were not returned early enough to be counted. As a Democratic-Republican, Mallary successfully contested the election of Orsamus C. Merrill to the Sixteenth Congress.

Mallary served six terms in Congress. He was elected as a Democratic-Republican to the Seventeenth Congress, reelected as an Adams-Clay Democratic-Republican to the Eighteenth Congress, and elected as an Adams candidate to the Nineteenth and Twentieth Congresses. He was reelected as an Anti-Jacksonian candidate to the Twenty-first and Twenty-second Congresses, serving from January 13, 1820, until his death in Baltimore, Maryland on April 15, 1831. He served as chairman of the Committee on Manufactures in the Nineteenth through Twenty-first Congresses.

Death
Mallary is interred in East Poultney Cemetery, in East Poultney, Vermont.

Further reading
 Graffagnino, J. Kevin. "'I saw the ruin all around' and 'A comical spot you may depend': Orasmus C. Merrill, Rollin C. Mallary, and the Disputed Congressional Election of 1818." Vermont History 49 (Summer 1981): 159-68.

See also
List of United States Congress members who died in office (1790–1899)

References

External links

 
 The Political Graveyard
 govtrack.us
 Massachusetts Historical Society: Rollin C. Mallary
 ancestry.com

1784 births
1831 deaths
Middlebury College alumni
Vermont National Republicans
Democratic-Republican Party members of the United States House of Representatives from Vermont
National Republican Party members of the United States House of Representatives
19th-century American politicians
State's attorneys in Vermont
Vermont lawyers
Burials in Vermont
19th-century American lawyers